Harrisimemna is a genus of moths of the family Noctuidae. The genus was erected by Augustus Radcliffe Grote in 1873.

Species
Harrisimemna trisignata (Walker, 1856) Ontario, Massachusetts, New York, Pennsylvania, Wisconsin, Missouri
Harrisimemna marmorata Hampson, 1908 Japan

References

Acronictinae